Rathcorbally is a townland in County Westmeath, Ireland.

Rathcorbally is one of 11 townlands of the civil parish of Taghmon in the barony of Corkaree in the Province of Leinster.

The neighbouring townlands are: Taghmon to the north, Balreagh to the east, Downs to the south, Monkstown to the west and Glebe to the north–west.

In the 1911 census of Ireland there were 6 houses and 23 inhabitants in the townland.

References

External links
Map of Rathcorbally at openstreetmap.org
Rathcorbally at the IreAtlas Townland Data Base
Rathcorbally at Townlands.ie
Rathcorbally at The Placenames Database of Ireland

Townlands of County Westmeath